The 2016–17 Philadelphia Flyers season was the 50th season for the National Hockey League franchise that was established on June 5, 1967. This was the 2nd season under head coach Dave Hakstol. The Flyers missed the playoffs, finishing 11th in the Eastern Conference and 6th in the Metropolitan Division.

Off-season

The Flyers had a relatively quiet off-season, with their main actions being to re-sign Radko Gudas and Brayden Schenn to 4-year extensions. Nick Cousins and Brandon Manning who both saw significant time the previous season were also retained. With the Flyers electing not to re-sign Ryan White and Sam Gagner, they moved to sign free agent Dale Weise on July 1 to a 4-year $9.4 million deal, also adding Boyd Gordon on a 1-year deal the same day.

Standings

Divisional standings

Conference standings

Schedule and results

Preseason

|- style="background:#fcc;"
| 1 || September 26 || Philadelphia || 0–2 || New Jersey || || Lyon || 7,415 || 0–1–0 || 
|- style="background:#fcc;"
| 2 || September 26 || Philadelphia || 0–3 || NY Islanders || || Stolarz || –– || 0–2–0 || 
|- style="background:#cfc;"
| 3 || September 27 || NY Islanders || 0–4 || Philadelphia || || Mason || 17,721 || 1–2–0 || 
|- style="background:#cfc;"
| 4 || September 28 || New Jersey || 0–2 || Philadelphia || || – || – || 2–2–0 || 
|- style="background:#ffc;"
| 5 || October 1 || Boston || 4–3 || Philadelphia || SO || Neuvirth || 17,920 || 2–2–1 || 
|- style="background:#cfc;"
| 6 || October 3 || NY Rangers || 3–4 || Philadelphia || OT || Mason || 18,636 || 3–2–1 || 
|- style="background:#cfc;"
| 7 || October 6 || Philadelphia || 4–2 || NY Rangers || || Neuvirth || 18,200 || 4–2–1 || 
|- style="background:#ffc;"
| 8 || October 8 || Philadelphia || 0–1 || Boston || OT || Mason || 17,202 || 4–2–2 || 
|-
| colspan="10" style="text-align:center;"|
Notes:
 Indicates split-squad game.
 Game was played at PPL Center in Allentown, Pennsylvania.
|-

|-
| Legend:

Regular season

|- style="background:#cfc;"
| 1 || October 14 || Philadelphia || 4–2 || Los Angeles || || Neuvirth || 18,453 || 1–0–0 || 2 || 
|- style="background:#ffc;"
| 2 || October 15 || Philadelphia || 3–4 || Arizona || OT || Mason || 17,125 || 1–0–1 || 3 || 
|- style="background:#fcc;"
| 3 || October 18 || Philadelphia || 4–7 || Chicago || || Mason || 21,263 || 1–1–1 || 3 || 
|- style="background:#fcc;"
| 4 || October 20 || Anaheim || 3–2 || Philadelphia || || Mason || 19,982 || 1–2–1 || 3 || 
|- style="background:#cfc;"
| 5 || October 22 || Carolina || 3–6 || Philadelphia || || Mason || 19,668 || 2–2–1 || 5 || 
|- style="background:#fcc;"
| 6 || October 24 || Philadelphia || 1–3 || Montreal || || Mason || 21,288 || 2–3–1 || 5 || 
|- style="background:#cfc;"
| 7 || October 25 || Buffalo || 3–4 || Philadelphia || SO || Mason || 19,209 || 3–3–1 || 7 || 
|- style="background:#fcc;"
| 8 || October 27 || Arizona || 5–4 || Philadelphia || || Mason || 19,432 || 3–4–1 || 7 || 
|- style="background:#fcc;"
| 9 || October 29 || Pittsburgh || 5–4 || Philadelphia || || Neuvirth || 19,927 || 3–5–1 || 7 || 
|- style="background:#cfc;"
| 10 || October 30 || Philadelphia || 4–3 || Carolina || || Neuvirth || 10,353 || 4–5–1 || 9 || 
|-

|- style="background:#cfc;"
| 11 || November 2 || Detroit || 3–4 || Philadelphia || OT || Neuvirth || 19,309 || 5–5–1 || 11 || 
|- style="background:#cfc;"
| 12 || November 3 || Philadelphia || 3–2 || NY Islanders || SO || Neuvirth || 11,119 || 6–5–1 || 13 || 
|- style="background:#fcc;"
| 13 || November 5 || Philadelphia || 4–5 || Montreal || || Neuvirth || 21,288 || 6–6–1 || 13 || 
|- style="background:#ffc;"
| 14 || November 8 || Detroit || 3–2 || Philadelphia || SO || Mason || 19,598 || 6–6–2 || 14 || 
|- style="background:#fcc;"
| 15 || November 11 || Philadelphia || 3–6 || Toronto || || Mason || 19,189 || 6–7–2 || 14 || 
|- style="background:#cfc;"
| 16 || November 12 || Minnesota || 2–3 || Philadelphia || || Mason || 19,591 || 7–7–2 || 16 || 
|- style="background:#ffc;"
| 17 || November 15 || Ottawa || 3–2 || Philadelphia || SO || Mason || 19,358 || 7–7–3 || 17 || 
|- style="background:#cfc;"
| 18 || November 17 || Winnipeg || 2–5 || Philadelphia || || Mason || 19,432 || 8–7–3 || 19 || 
|- style="background:#fcc;"
| 19 || November 19 || Tampa Bay || 3–0 || Philadelphia || || Mason || 19,732 || 8–8–3 || 19 || 
|- style="background:#cfc;"
| 20 || November 22 || Philadelphia || 3–1 || Florida || || Mason || 15,515 || 9–8–3 || 21 || 
|- style="background:#fcc;"
| 21 || November 23 || Philadelphia || 2–4 || Tampa Bay || || Mason || 19,092 || 9–9–3 || 21 || 
|- style="background:#fcc;"
| 22 || November 25 || NY Rangers || 3–2 || Philadelphia || || Mason || 19,981 || 9–10–3 || 21 || 
|- style="background:#cfc;"
| 23 || November 27 || Calgary || 3–5 || Philadelphia || || Stolarz || 19,408 || 10–10–3 || 23 || 
|- style="background:#cfc;"
| 24 || November 29 || Boston || 2–3 || Philadelphia || SO || Mason || 19,558 || 11–10–3 || 25 || 
|-

|- style="background:#cfc;"
| 25 || December 1 || Philadelphia || 3–2 || Ottawa || OT || Mason || 14,334 || 12–10–3 || 27 || 
|- style="background:#cfc;"
| 26 || December 3 || Chicago || 1–3 || Philadelphia || || Mason || 19,487 || 13–10–3 || 29 || 
|- style="background:#cfc;"
| 27 || December 4 || Philadelphia || 4–2 || Nashville || || Mason || 17,113 || 14–10–3 || 31 || 
|- style="background:#cfc;"
| 28 || December 6 || Florida || 2–3 || Philadelphia || OT || Mason || 18,999 || 15–10–3 || 33 || 
|- style="background:#cfc;"
| 29 || December 8 || Edmonton || 5–6 || Philadelphia || || Mason || 19,346 || 16–10–3 || 35 || 
|- style="background:#cfc;"
| 30 || December 10 || Dallas || 2–4 || Philadelphia || || Mason || 19,594 || 17–10–3 || 37 || 
|- style="background:#cfc;"
| 31 || December 11 || Philadelphia || 1–0 || Detroit || OT || Stolarz || 20,027 || 18–10–3 || 39 || 
|- style="background:#cfc;"
| 32 || December 14 || Philadelphia || 4–3 || Colorado || || Mason || 14,456 || 19–10–3 || 41 || 
|- style="background:#fcc;"
| 33 || December 17 || Philadelphia || 1–3 || Dallas || || Mason || 18,423 || 19–11–3 || 41 || 
|- style="background:#ffc;"
| 34 || December 19 || Nashville || 2–1 || Philadelphia || SO || Mason || 19,660 || 19–11–4 || 42 || 
|- style="background:#cfc;"
| 35 || December 21 || Washington || 2–3 || Philadelphia || SO || Mason || 20,011 || 20–11–4 || 44 || 
|- style="background:#fcc;"
| 36 || December 22 || Philadelphia || 0–4 || New Jersey || || Mason || 16,514 || 20–12–4 || 44 || 
|- style="background:#fcc;"
| 37 || December 28 || Philadelphia || 3–6 || St. Louis || || Mason || 19,409 || 20–13–4 || 44 || 
|- style="background:#fcc;"
| 38 || December 30 || Philadelphia || 0–2 || San Jose || || Mason || 17,562 || 20–14–4 || 44 || 
|-

|- style="background:#ffc;"
| 39 || January 1 || Philadelphia || 3–4 || Anaheim || SO || Mason || 17,174 || 20–14–5 || 45 || 
|- style="background:#fcc;"
| 40 || January 4 || NY Rangers || 5–2 || Philadelphia || || Mason || 19,858 || 20–15–5 || 45 || 
|- style="background:#cfc;"
| 41 || January 7 || Tampa Bay || 2–4 || Philadelphia || || Neuvirth || 19,810 || 21–15–5 || 47 || 
|- style="background:#ffc;"
| 42 || January 8 || Philadelphia || 1–2 || Columbus || OT || Mason || 17,962 || 21–15–6 || 48 || 
|- style="background:#fcc;"
| 43 || January 10 || Philadelphia || 1–4 || Buffalo || || Mason || 18,920 || 21–16–6 || 48 || 
|- style="background:#cfc;"
| 44 || January 12 || Vancouver || 4–5 || Philadelphia || SO || Neuvirth || 19,757 || 22–16–6 || 50 || 
|- style="background:#fcc;"
| 45 || January 14 || Philadelphia || 3–6 || Boston || || Neuvirth || 17,565 || 22–17–6 || 50 || 
|- style="background:#fcc;"
| 46 || January 15 || Philadelphia || 0–5 || Washington || || Mason || 18,506 || 22–18–6 || 50 || 
|- style="background:#fcc;"
| 47 || January 21 || New Jersey || 4–1 || Philadelphia || || Neuvirth || 19,932 || 22–19–6 || 50 || 
|- style="background:#cfc;"
| 48 || January 22 || Philadelphia || 3–2 || NY Islanders || OT || Mason || 13,146 || 23–19–6 || 52 || 
|- style="background:#cfc;"
| 49 || January 25 || Philadelphia || 2–0 || NY Rangers || || Mason || 18,006 || 24–19–6 || 54 || 
|- style="background:#cfc;"
| 50 || January 26 || Toronto || 1–2 || Philadelphia || || Neuvirth || 19,723 || 25–19–6 || 56 || 
|- style="background:#bbcaff;"
|colspan="2" | January 27–29 ||colspan="10" | All-Star Break in Los Angeles
|- style="background:#fcc;"
| 51 || January 31 || Philadelphia || 1–5 || Carolina || || Mason || 13,577 || 25–20–6 || 56 || 
|-

|- style="background:#cfc;"
| 52 || February 2 || Montreal || 1–3 || Philadelphia || || Neuvirth || 19,768 || 26–20–6 || 58 || 
|- style="background:#ffc;"
| 53 || February 4 || Los Angeles || 1–0 || Philadelphia || OT || Neuvirth || 19,833 || 26–20–7 || 59 || 
|- style="background:#fcc;"
| 54 || February 6 || St. Louis || 2–0 || Philadelphia || || Neuvirth || 19,589 || 26–21–7 || 59 || 
|- style="background:#fcc;"
| 55 || February 9 || NY Islanders || 3–1 || Philadelphia || || Mason || 19,737 || 26–22–7 || 59 || 
|- style="background:#cfc;"
| 56 || February 11 || San Jose || 1–2 || Philadelphia || OT || Neuvirth || 19,910 || 27–22–7 || 61 || 
|- style="background:#fcc;"
| 57 || February 15 || Philadelphia || 1–3 || Calgary || || Neuvirth || 18,815 || 27–23–7 || 61 || 
|- style="background:#fcc;"
| 58 || February 16 || Philadelphia || 3–6 || Edmonton || || Neuvirth || 18,347 || 27–24–7 || 61 || 
|- style="background:#cfc;"
| 59 || February 19 || Philadelphia || 3–2 || Vancouver || || Neuvirth || 18,865 || 28–24–7 || 63 || 
|- style="background:#fcc;"
| 60 || February 22 || Washington || 4–1 || Philadelphia || || Neuvirth || 19,849 || 28–25–7 || 63 || 
|- style="background:#fcc;"
| 61 || February 25 || Philadelphia || 2–4 || Pittsburgh || || Neuvirth || 67,318(outdoors) || 28–26–7 || 63 || 
|- style="background:#cfc;"
| 62 || February 28 || Colorado || 0–4 || Philadelphia || || Mason || 19,564 || 29–26–7 || 65 || 
|-

|- style="background:#cfc;"
| 63 || March 2 || Florida || 1–2 || Philadelphia || SO || Mason || 19,650 || 30–26–7 || 67 || 
|- style="background:#ffc;"
| 64 || March 4 || Philadelphia || 1–2 || Washington || OT || Mason || 18,506 || 30–26–8 || 68 || 
|- style="background:#cfc;"
| 65 || March 7 || Philadelphia || 6–3 || Buffalo || || Mason || 18,233 || 31–26–8 || 70 || 
|- style="background:#fcc;"
| 66 || March 9 || Philadelphia || 2–4 || Toronto || || Neuvirth || 18,894 || 31–27–8 || 70 || 
|- style="background:#fcc;"
| 67 || March 11 || Philadelphia || 1–2 || Boston || || Mason || 17,565 || 31–28–8 || 70 || 
|- style="background:#fcc;"
| 68 || March 13 || Columbus || 5–3 || Philadelphia || || Mason || 19,447 || 31–29–8 || 70 || 
|- style="background:#cfc;"
| 69 || March 15 || Pittsburgh || 0–4 || Philadelphia || || Mason || 19,514 || 32–29–8 || 72 || 
|- style="background:#fcc;"
| 70 || March 16 || Philadelphia || 2–6 || New Jersey || || Mason || 13,718 || 32–30–8 || 72 || 
|- style="background:#cfc;"
| 71 || March 19 || Carolina || 3–4 || Philadelphia || OT || Mason || 19,517 || 33–30–8 || 74 || 
|- style="background:#fcc;"
| 72 || March 21 || Philadelphia || 2–3 || Winnipeg || || Mason || 15,294 || 33–31–8 || 74 || 
|- style="background:#cfc;"
| 73 || March 23 || Philadelphia || 3–1 || Minnesota || || Mason || 19,004 || 34–31–8 || 76 || 
|- style="background:#fcc;"
| 74 || March 25 || Philadelphia || 0–1 || Columbus || || Neuvirth || 19,052 || 34–32–8 || 76 || 
|- style="background:#cfc;"
| 75 || March 26 || Philadelphia || 6–2 || Pittsburgh || || Mason || 18,654 || 35–32–8 || 78 || 
|- style="background:#cfc;"
| 76 || March 28 || Ottawa || 2–3 || Philadelphia || SO || Mason || 19,706 || 36–32–8 || 80 || 
|- style="background:#cfc;"
| 77 || March 30 || NY Islanders || 3–6 || Philadelphia || || Mason || 19,703 || 37–32–8 || 82 || 
|-

|- style="background:#cfc;"
| 78 || April 1 || New Jersey || 0–3 || Philadelphia || || Neuvirth || 19,911 || 38–32–8 || 84 || 
|- style="background:#fcc;"
| 79 || April 2 || Philadelphia || 3–4 || NY Rangers || || Stolarz || 18,006 || 38–33–8 || 84 || 
|- style="background:#ffc;"
| 80 || April 4 || Philadelphia || 0–1 || New Jersey || OT || Mason || 13,861 || 38–33–9 || 85 || 
|- style="background:#cfc;"
| 81 || April 8 || Columbus || 2–4 || Philadelphia || || Mason || 19,789 || 39–33–9 || 87 || 
|- style="background:#ffc;"
| 82 || April 9 || Carolina || 4–3 || Philadelphia || SO || Stolarz || 19,559 || 39–33–10 || 88 || 
|-

|-
| Legend:

Player stats

Scoring
 Position abbreviations: C = Center; D = Defense; G = Goaltender; LW = Left Wing; RW = Right Wing
  = Joined team via a transaction (e.g., trade, waivers, signing) during the season. Stats reflect time with the Flyers only.
  = Left team via a transaction (e.g., trade, waivers, release) during the season. Stats reflect time with the Flyers only.

Goaltending

Awards and records

Awards

Records

Among the team records set during the 2016–17 season was Brayden Schenn scoring three powerplay goals on December 10, tying a team record. The Flyers seven shootout wins on the season is the franchise single season high.

Milestones

Suspensions and fines

Transactions
The Flyers were involved in the following transactions from June 13, 2016, the day after the deciding game of the 2016 Stanley Cup Finals, through June 11, 2017, the day of the deciding game of the 2017 Stanley Cup Finals.

Trades

Players acquired

Players lost

Signings

Draft picks

Below are the Philadelphia Flyers' selections at the 2016 NHL Entry Draft, held on June 24–25, 2016 at the First Niagara Center in Buffalo, New York.

Notes

References
General
 
 
 
Specific

Philadelphia Flyers seasons
Philadelphia Flyers
Philadelphia
Philadelphia